Bere Bay is an Arctic waterway in the Qikiqtaaluk Region, Nunavut, Canada. It is located in Norwegian Bay, off Devon Island's Grinnell Peninsula. Triton Bay is to the southeast.

External links
 Bere Bay, Nunavut at Atlas of Canada

Bays of Qikiqtaaluk Region